Sherman Township is the name of a number of places in the U.S. state of Kansas:
 Sherman Township, Clay County, Kansas
 Sherman Township, Crawford County, Kansas
 Sherman Township, Decatur County, Kansas
 Sherman Township, Dickinson County, Kansas
 Sherman Township, Ellsworth County, Kansas
 Sherman Township, Grant County, Kansas
 Sherman Township, Leavenworth County, Kansas
 Sherman Township, Ottawa County, Kansas
 Sherman Township, Pottawatomie County, Kansas
 Sherman Township, Riley County, Kansas
 Sherman Township, Sedgwick County, Kansas
 Sherman Township, Washington County, Kansas

See also
 Sherman Township (disambiguation)

Kansas township disambiguation pages